Simon Brown (born August 15, 1963, in Clarendon, Jamaica) is a former professional boxer.  Known as "Mantequilla", a name given to him by his famous trainer Jose 'Pepe' Correa, Brown was two-weight world champion in the welterweight and light-middleweight divisions, and at one point considered one of the best pound-for-pound fighters in boxing.

Professional boxing career

Welterweight
Brown began his career in 1982 at the age of 19 and ran off a string of 21 consecutive victories, prior to losing a split decision to Marlon Starling for the USBA welterweight title in 1985.  Simon won three consecutive bouts, including a victory against undefeated former Olympian Shawn O'Sullivan to line up a shot at the vacant IBF welterweight title against Tyrone Trice.  Brown won via 14th round TKO and went on to successfully defend his title 9 times, including a unification bout with Lineal/WBC welterweight champion Maurice Blocker, winning by TKO in the 10th.  Brown lost his belts in his next fight to James McGirt.

Light-middleweight
After the loss, Brown moved up to light-middleweight and in 1993 defeated Terry Norris via a devastating 4th round KO to win the WBC light-middleweight title in a fight proclaimed Upset of the Year by Ring Magazine. After making one successful defense of the WBC title against Troy Waters, Brown lost a rematch and the title to Norris via a clear decision in May 1994.

In 1995, Brown challenged IBF light-middleweight title holder Vincent Pettway. Brown knocked Pettway down towards the end of round one, and was knocked down by a Pettway right hand in round three. In round five, Brown hit Pettway low then continued to hit Pettway until Pettway fell through the ropes. Not seeing the low blow, the referee ruled a knockdown. In round six, Brown was knocked out by a Pettway left hook. Brown famously continued to throw punches whilst lying on his back unconscious.

In his next bout, Brown lost a hard-fought ten round decision to former WBA welterweight title holder Aaron Davis.

Middleweight
In August 1996, Brown challenged undefeated WBO middleweight title holder Lonnie Bradley and lost a unanimous decision. Brown then challenged IBF middleweight title holder Bernard Hopkins in January 1998, but lost via TKO in the round six. This was to be Brown's last title shot.

After the loss to Hopkins, he went on a five fight losing streak, including defeats to Olympian David Reid and Omar Sheika, and retired after the loss to Sheika in 2000.

Simon Brown is now a trainer in Hagerstown, MD.

Professional boxing record

See also
List of welterweight boxing champions
List of light middleweight boxing champions

References

|-

|-

|-

External links
 

1963 births
Living people
Light-middleweight boxers
People from Clarendon Parish, Jamaica
Jamaican male boxers